The Doctor's Dilemma may refer to:

 The Doctor's Dilemma (play), a 1906 work by George Bernard Shaw
 The Doctor's Dilemma (film), a 1958 British film directed by Anthony Asquith based on the play
 The Doctors' Dilemmas or The Doctors' Dilemma, a 1962 book by Dr. Louis Lasagna